Avaldsnes Idrettslag is a Norwegian sports club from Avaldsnes, Karmøy, Rogaland. It was founded on 16 June 1937. The club has sections for football and handball.

Women's football
The women's team began play in 1989, winning the 1st Division of West Norway in 1997, before the team was dissolved in 1999 and then resurrected in 2002. The women's football team currently plays in the Toppserien, the first tier of Norwegian women's football, after promotion from the First Division in 2012, becoming the first club from Karmøy to play in the top league of any sport in Norway. They reached the final of the Norwegian Women's Cup in 2013 and 2015 but lost in the final both times.

The footballer Cecilie Pedersen has previously represented Norway while playing for Avaldsnes.

They finished the 2015 season in second place, their highest finish in the Toppserien to date, and qualified to the 2016–17 UEFA Women's Champions League.

Women's football squad

Former players

Honours
Toppserien
Runners-up (3): 2015, 2016, 2017
 Norwegian Women's Cup
Winners (1): 2017
Runners-up (2): 2013, 2015

Recent women's seasons
{|class="wikitable"
|-bgcolor="#efefef"
! Season
!
! Pos.
! Pl.
! W
! D
! L
! GS
! GA
! P
!Cup
!Notes
|-
|2009
|D2
|align=right |5
|align=right|18||align=right|7||align=right|3||align=right|8
|align=right|43||align=right|54||align=right|24
||Not Qualified
|
|-
|2010
|D2
|align=right bgcolor=#DDFFDD| 1
|align=right|22||align=right|17||align=right|2||align=right|3
|align=right|116||align=right|42||align=right|53
||Not Qualified
|Promoted to Division 1
|-
|2011
|D1
|align=right |6
|align=right|20||align=right|8||align=right|5||align=right|7
|align=right|35||align=right|37||align=right|29
||2nd round
|
|-
|2012
|D1
|align=right bgcolor=#DDFFDD| 1
|align=right|22||align=right|20||align=right|1||align=right|1
|align=right|73||align=right|20||align=right|61
||3rd round
|Promoted to Toppserien
|-
|2013
|TS
|align=right | 4
|align=right|22||align=right|10||align=right|3||align=right|9
|align=right|39||align=right|33||align=right|33
|bgcolor=silver|Runners-up
|Lost Cup final to Stabæk 1–0
|-
|2014
|TS
|align=right | 5
|align=right|22||align=right|12||align=right|2||align=right|8
|align=right|56||align=right|27||align=right|38
||Semi-final
|
|-
|2015
|TS
|align=right bgcolor=silver | 2
|align=right|22 ||align=right|16 ||align=right|3 ||align=right| 3
|align=right|60 ||align=right|15 ||align=right|51
|bgcolor=silver|Runners-up
|Lost Cup final to LSK Kvinner 3–2
|-
|2016
|TS
|align=right bgcolor=silver | 2
|align=right|22 ||align=right|18 ||align=right|2 ||align=right| 2
|align=right|50 ||align=right|17 ||align=right|56
||Quarter-final
|
|-
|2017
|TS
|align=right bgcolor=silver | 2
|align=right|22 ||align=right|15 ||align=right|3 ||align=right| 4
|align=right|51 ||align=right|17 ||align=right|48
|bgcolor=gold|Winners
|Beat Vålerenga 1-0 in the final to win the Cup
|-
|2018
|TS
|align=right | 9
|align=right|22 ||align=right|5 ||align=right|6 ||align=right| 11
|align=right|24 ||align=right|38 ||align=right|21
||3rd round
|
|-
|2019
|TS
|align=right | 5
|align=right|22 ||align=right|9 ||align=right|7 ||align=right| 6
|align=right|40 ||align=right|33 ||align=right|34
||Quarter-final
|
|-
|2020
|TS
|align=right bgcolor="#deb678" | 3
|align=right|18 ||align=right|10||align=right|4 ||align=right| 4
|align=right|31||align=right|21||align=right|34
||Semi-final
|
|-
|2021
|TS
|align=right | 8
|align=right|18 ||align=right|3||align=right|3 ||align=right| 12
|align=right|25||align=right|35||align=right|12
||Quarter-final
|
|}

UEFA Competition Record

a First leg.

Men's football

The men's football team currently plays in the Fourth Division, the fifth tier of Norwegian football, after relegation in 2012. The men's team also played in the Third Division between 2005 and 2010.

References

External links
 Official site 

Football clubs in Norway
Sport in Rogaland
Karmøy
Association football clubs established in 1937
1937 establishments in Norway
Women's football clubs in Norway